Cub is a nickname of:

 Cub Buck (1892–1966), American football player and coach
 Cub Koda (1948–2000), American musician
 Cub Stricker (1859–1937), American baseball player
 Cub Swanson (born 1983), American mixed martial artist

Lists of people by nickname